Susan "Sue" Ronan (born 21 February 1964) is an Irish football coach and former player, who managed the Republic of Ireland women's national football team from 2010 until 2016.

Ronan represented Welsox and Shelbourne at club level, and made her debut as a player for Ireland in 1988. She won 22 caps and was named FAI Women's Player of the Year in 1993.

In October 2010 she succeeded Noel King as head coach of the senior Republic of Ireland women's national football team. She stood down from the position in 2016, to take a role as the Football Association of Ireland's head of women's football. She had obtained a UEFA Pro Licence in 2015.

References

Living people
Republic of Ireland women's association footballers
Republic of Ireland women's international footballers
Women's national association football team managers
1964 births
Shelbourne F.C. (women) players
Republic of Ireland women's national football team managers
Dublin Women's Soccer League players
Women's association footballers not categorized by position
Female association football managers